Santa Maria Maddalena is a rural and rustic, Romanesque-style, Roman Catholic church located outside the town of Pievebovigliana, province of Macerata, region of Marche, Italy.

History
The church is a simple rectangular stone structure with thick internal pilasters on a hill of the same name. The exterior almost lacks any decoration: the portal is made of rounded stone with a single narrow window above. There are no windows in the nave. The interior has highly deteriorated frescoes depicting a crucifix, a Magdalen, and some angels attributed to Cola Di Pietro.

References

Romanesque architecture in le Marche
Pievebovigliana
Roman Catholic churches in the Marche